Babi Xavier (born Anna Bárbara Xavier; 6 July 1974, in Niterói, Rio de Janeiro) is a Brazilian television actress, Playboy model, singer and TV hostess.

Career 
Babi made her TV debut on the soap opera Perdidos de Amor in 1996, which aired on Rede Bandeirantes. Then, in 1997, she acted in the soap opera Por Amor (For Love), on Rede Globo.  A year later, she was chosen to present the news program Sintonia Fina, where she learned the trade of hostess and rescued her childhood nickname, Babi.  The following year, she added to her work the position of presenter at MTV Brasil, where she had her highlight with the MTV Erótica program, in which she talked together with doctor Jairo Bouer, about sexuality and behavior. At the station she completed her activities ahead of the programs Mochilão Abrolhos and Supermodel.

Television
Perdidos de Amor (Band, 1996) – Ivea, actress
Por Amor (Globo, 1997) – Aninha, actress
Sintonia Fina (SKY Brasil, 1998)
Erótica MTV (MTV, 1998)
Mochilão MTV (MTV, 1999)
Supermodel (MTV, 1999)
Programa Livre (SBT, 1999)
Ilha da Sedução (SBT, 2002)
Bang Bang (Globo, 2005) – Marylin Corroy, actress
Vidas Opostas (Record, 2006 and 2007) – Patrícia Rocha, actress
Os Mutantes – Caminhos do Coração (Record, 2008) – Júli di Trevi, actress
A Fazenda, (Record), 2009.
José do Egito, (Record), 2013. – Elisa
Os Dez Mandamentos (RecordTV), 2015

Television – Guest Star

Você Decide – (Globo, 1996) – Episode: Véu de Noiva, actress
A Diarista – (Globo, 2005) – Episode: Aquele do Anão, actress
Dança dos Famosos, Domingão do Faustão – (Globo, 2006), dancer

Season 3: The third season premiered on May 14, 2006, and ended August 6, 2006. The number of couples expanded from six the previous season to twelve. 
It was divided in two rounds. In the first, men will dance separated of women. After 4 couples eliminated, the 8 couples left begin the final round where everybody dances together.

Couples

Results

Dances

 Highest Scoring Dance
 Lowest Scoring Dance
 Withdrawn Dance (Not Performed/Scored)

Call-Out Order

 The celebrity was the first of the week
 The celebrity withdrew from the competition
 The celebrity was eliminated
 The celebrity won the competition

The Farm (TV series) (Record, 2009) – A Fazenda/Reality Show

Music
 Babi - Do Jeito Que Eu Quero (2002), Universal Music
Track list:
"Imunização Racional (Que Beleza)" 
"Só O Que Preciso Ter"
"O Que Será (À Flor Da Terra)"
"É Tudo Que Eu Tenho Pra Dizer (Revelação)"
"Não Quero Lembrar"
"Baby, Não Pare"
"Chamar Pra Dançar"
"Quero Passar"
"Só Pra Ser"

References

External links
Babi Xavier Official Web Site
Babi Xavier Official Blog

1974 births
Living people
Brazilian telenovela actresses
Brazilian television actresses
Brazilian television personalities
The Farm (TV series) contestants
People from Niterói
21st-century Brazilian singers
21st-century Brazilian women singers
2000s Playboy Playmates